Martin/Molloy was an Australian radio program starring Tony Martin and Mick Molloy, both formerly of The D-Generation and The Late Show. It was broadcast nationwide on 54 radio stations for two hours on weekday evenings between 1995 and 1998.

The Martin/Molloy Team

About the show
The program was known for its wit and satire, but also, as both performers constantly admitted, a large degree of toilet humour. The use of such low-brow comedy was frequently mocked by the hosts themselves. They caused occasional controversy, such as when they made repeated fun of Mal Colston's son for shouting at the media camped outside Colston's family home.

Much of the show consisted of banter between Martin and Molloy, interspersed with music and sketches. These sketches frequently lampooned celebrities, with impersonations provided by Martin.
The show's announcer, Pete Smith regularly participated in sketches, often lampooning his own image as a former Sale of the Century announcer.

The pair would also interview celebrities, often bringing the guests to fits of laughter. Samuel L. Jackson was declared their favourite guest.

Each show would end by thanking the cast, crew and audience.

The show was most successful when satirising Australian society and individuals. One example is a pretend episode of 60 Minutes in which young people were portrayed as evil in typically one-sided fashion. Another was a supposed newsreel concerning the political popularity of a bag of sawdust, a thinly-veiled and scathing attack on Pauline Hanson. Another memorable sketch was the performance of the Spice Boys (a parody of the Spice Girls) singing a song with lyrics including "I've got graphic footage of Laurie Oakes eating a chocolate éclair", and was just an example of the biting satire that Martin/Molloy provided.

Martin/Molloy received several radio industry awards and produced three ARIA Award-winning albums The Brown Album (1995), Poop Chute (1996) and Eat Your Peas (1998).

The show ended in December 1998 when both performers claimed exhaustion. On the final show (Dec. 4, 1998), Martin and Molloy were to play the final song on their playlist, "Cruel" by Human Nature, but rejected this in favour of more highlights of previous shows. The last skit was given to news presenter Jim Waley, whose soundbites were arranged so he sang a song called "Crazy lesbians full of Beans" to the tune of "Voodoo People" by The Prodigy. The last words, played at the end of a montage, was a recording made earlier in the show of Rob Sitch saying "Martin Molloy have left the building" through a megaphone.

The theme song to this radio show was "Eighteen Strings" by Tinman.

Segments

What's All That About
Every Friday Mick would choose a topic of his choice and simply ask the question "What's All That About?" A humorous slant on the topics of the day.

Please Explain!
This segment was created based on a Pauline Hanson quote. The quote was used frequently on the show before it was given its own segment in which the quote was played quite frequently. Pauline herself was often used as a subject in this section of the show where Tony and Mick would ponder and try to explain quotes made my famous people (mainly politicians) during the week. The segment was replaced with another based on another Pauline Hanson quote "I Don't Like It". The segment was renamed "Peas Explain" during the final two weeks of the program to promote the Eat Your Peas album.

I Don't Like It
This segment was simply Mick and Tony choosing something they don't like and ranting about it. There was frequent use of the "I don't like it" quote by the infamous Pauline Hanson.

Paul Hester
Not really a segment, but starting from 1996 Paul Hester would become a regular guest on the show every Friday, provided that the album Recurring Dream by Crowded House (of which he was the drummer) was number 1 on the ARIA charts, an arrangement that lasted many weeks. Even after the album dropped out of the top 40 altogether, Hester remained as a frequent guest on the program. Hester's foray into the media would continue when he soon hosted the show Hessie's Shed.

Freakwatch
A rundown of bizarre celebrity behaviour, usually Michael Jackson.

Top Night
Another segment was called "Top Night". Callers would ring in with accounts of their exploits. One man reported that after a big night on the booze, he had lost his keys thus locking himself out of his apartment. He began scaling the drainpipe to reach his bathroom window. The drainpipe tore away from the side of the building and he fell 20 feet to the ground fracturing his wrist. The neighbours had already called police who duly attended the scene and arrested the man for attempted burglary. Mick and Tony gave that a huge "Top Night" thumbs up!

Radio Gladiators
Daily segment/competition where Tony and Mick would discuss the topic of the day and then choose a handful of listeners to call in to briefly discuss the chosen topic with the hosts. The caller that Tony and Mick deemed the best was awarded a prize.

Shoot the Celebrity In the Arse
A segment where listeners where invited to call in and "shoot" (with wacky sound effects) a celebrity (either guest, or celebrity that is the topic of discussion) in the arse.

Hot Poo
A discussion of scandalous political events or comments of the week. The theme tune was "Hot Stuff" by Donna Summer.

Video Skeet Shooting
A segment where Tony and Mick allow people to call up and tell the pair what videos they do not like so they can shoot the video out of a suped-up Betamax recorder and shoot the video with a crimped shotgun. When the duo miss the video, they get either Gracie or Pete Smith to shoot the video down with various guns ranging from an AK-47 to the Iraqi supergun.

Recurring characters

Tum and Phul
A pair of New Zealand radio hosts voiced by Martin in an exaggerated New Zealand accent, each sketch was basically a string of names and words to get best comedy value out of the changed vowels and flattened I's in the stereotyped New Zealand accent (see New Zealand English). The characters have also made a return appearance in 2006 a sketch on Martin's new show Get This. (Ironically, Tony Martin was born in New Zealand.)

Blimpy the Lactose Intolerant Cat
An example of the level of toilet humour on the show, the character consisted of the stock sound effects of an angry meowing cat and wet splat noises. Originally a one off sketch, the character proved so successful that a whole series of serials involving Blimpy and the family that owned him in ever more absurd methods of setting him off. Blimpy was one of the characters who appeared in the Martin/Molloy comic book.

The opening lyrics in the introduction were:
"Now it's time for the adventures of Blimpy the Lactose-Intolerant Cat. He's not very well, he's leaking a smell.  We should put him out but, it wouldn't be fair.  'Cause he's just a normal cat.. with the shits!"

The closing lyrics were:
"Tune in next week for more hijinks of Blimpy the Lactose-Intolerant Cat.  Don't step over there, don't sit in that chair.  Don't blame his intestines, it isn't his fault.  'Cause he's just a normal cat... with the shits!"

Blast FM
Another Martin voiced sketch, this time a parody of the presenter and technical inexperience of a community radio station.

Haughty Mick
A Molloy character who spoke in Old English and offered his 'seduction tips' to the listeners. Although, he proved his tips to be unsuccessful as his bad pick up lines always got a knock back from the damsels/wenches.

Fully Grown Baby
A baby  that looked and acted like a 30-year-old man, voiced and acting like Mick Molloy.

Girlie Man
A sensitive man who acted very effeminately. The introduction to this segment was a song, sung by both Tony and Mick to the tune of the Spider-Man theme but with no music, and contained the lines:
'Girlie Man, Girlie Man, shops at Portmans, loves fake tan. Skips to work, eats lean beef, always dresses like Penelope Keith. Look out! Here comes Girlie Man!'

The closing lyrics included: "Girlie Man, Girlie Man, lives in fear of dish-pan hands. Eats his peas, loves a kiss. Always sitting down to piss. Look out! Here comes Girlie Man!"

Humpy
A dog who would not stop humping his master's (voiced by Molloy) leg, a parody of various animal companion movies and TV series such as Lassie and Skippy the Bush Kangaroo.

The Giant Peach
A walking and talking peach with emotional problems.

Discography

Albums

Awards

ARIA Music Awards
The ARIA Music Awards is an annual awards ceremony that recognises excellence, innovation, and achievement across all genres of Australian music. Martin/Molloy won three awards, all in the category of ARIA Award for Best Comedy Release.

|-
|  rowspan="2"| 1996
| The Brown Album
| Best Comedy Release
| 
|-
| The Brown Album
| Highest Selling Album 
| 
|-
|  1997
| Poop Chute
| Best Comedy Release
| 
|-
|  1999
| Eat Your Peas
| Best Comedy Release
| 
|-

Life after Martin/Molloy

Martin and Molloy paired up for other projects, such as the films Crackerjack (2002) and Bad Eggs (2003) and the documentary Tackle Happy (2000), while Molloy starred in BoyTown (2005).

Martin played a small role in Molloy's controversial and short-lived 1999 TV series The Mick Molloy Show on the Nine Network. In 2004, Molloy returned to national radio, in Tough Love with Mick Molloy on the Triple M network, which ended in late 2006; Martin made regular guest appearances on this show. Molloy made another return to television on Nine in 2007 hosting another short-lived program, the satire-based news and current events show The Nation.

Martin has published two books based on humorous events and unorthodox situations throughout his life called Lolly Scramble (2005) and A Nest of Occasionals (2009), and hosted Get This with Ed Kavalee and Richard Marsland on the Triple M network from 2006-2007. Molloy was an occasional guest on this program prior to the pair's falling out in 2007.

Martin and Molloy had a falling out over a mockumentary Martin made for the DVD release of Molloy's BoyTown movie in February 2007. The 90 minute mockumentary, BoyTown Confidential was not included on the DVD, due to a claimed lack of time and money to finish it, and despite Martin offering to pay the costs himself. Martin was highly offended, claiming it was one of the best things he had ever done, and that people would assume it was not included because it was "terrible". Other prominent comedians backed Martin's claim that the mockumentary was outstanding comedy. The pair have not spoken since.

Preservation
In February 2013, Tony Martin gifted the original recordings of the show to the National Film & Sound Archive. The best of's — 185 audio cassettes — will be transferred to digital files for permanent storage at the NFSA.

References

ARIA Award winners
Australian comedy radio programs
Australian radio programs
1990s Australian radio programs